Busu Dima (Bishu Dima) is an annual cultural festival celebrated by the Dimasa Kachari tribe of India. It is the biggest harvesting festival. It is celebrated after the completion of grain harvest in different villages. The festival is usually organized in January.

Dance 
The festival is followed by singing accompanied by the rhythm of Kharam (drums), Muri (fife) the wooden bugle continues first to third days without stop. The boys and girls, everyone comes and they gather together with their traditional dress whole night by dancing in the festival.

References 

Festivals in Assam
January observances